Chinna Jameen is a 1993 Indian Tamil-language masala film directed by Raj Kapoor, starring Karthik and Sukanya. The film introduced former actress Vineetha in her Tamil and acting debut. It was released on 13 November 1993.

Plot 

Rasaiya is brought up as an innocent man who suffers torture in the hands of his cruel uncle Rathnavel to get hold of his property for which Rasaiya is considered as legal heir. He falls in love with Jothi; however, Rathnavel sets his henchman to molest and kill her. Sathya, who joins the village as a village administrative officer, turns out to be Jothi's sister who has arrived to avenge her sister's death. With the help of Rasaiya's friends, she transforms Rasaiya into a normal and strong person. In the end, Rasaiya kills Rathnavel and his henchmen and becomes a new heir to the palace.

Cast 
Karthik as Rasaiya/Chinna Jameendar
Sukanya as Sathya
Vineetha as Jothi
Rajesh as Rajamanickam
R. P. Viswam as Rathnavel
UdayaPrakash as Sedhupathy
Sabitha Anand as Amsaveni
Ganthimathi as Aatha
Goundamani as Thalayari Mama
Senthil as Vellasamy
King Kong as Sundeali
Thalapathy Dinesh as Fighter
Kovai Senthil as Villager

Soundtrack 

The music was composed by Ilaiyaraaja, with lyrics written by Vaali.

Reception 
MM of The Indian Express criticised Karthik's performance, stating "he is plainly out of elements", and said that Raj Kapoor's "script and treatment dont help either". R. P. R. of Kalki in their review also said the same.

References

External links 

1990s masala films
1990s Tamil-language films
1993 films
Films directed by Raj Kapoor (Tamil film director)
Films scored by Ilaiyaraaja